Sonali Chowdhury Ghosh Dastidar is an Indian film and television actress. She has worked in Bengali cinema and television shows, including Saat Bhai Champa, Jol Nupur and Agniparikkha.

Life
Choudhuri was born in Kolkata in 1980. She graduated from Calcutta University after attending Alipore Multipurpose Government Girls High School also in the Kolkata area.

Personal life
She is married to Rajat Ghosh Dastidar.

Films 
 Dotara (2019)
 Cut It (Unreleased)
 Cornel (Unreleased)
 Amar Prithibi (2015)
 8:08 Er Bongaon Local (2012)
 Bye Bye Bangkok (2011)
 Target (2010)
 Chha-e Chhuti (2009)
 Agni (2004)
 Shakti (2004)
 K Apon K Por (2003)
 Shiba (2002)
 Bidrohini (2020)

Television 
 Khela(Zee Bangla)
 Raja and Goja(Zee Bangla)
 Agnipariksha(Zee Bangla)
 Saat Bhai Champa as Rani Padmavati (Zee Bangla)
  Bodhisotter Bodhbiddhi (Zee Bangla)
 "Kundo Phuler Mala"(STAR jalsha) (later replaced by Debolina Dutta)
 Ichche Nodi(STAR Jalsha)
 Jol Nupur(STAR Jalsha)
 Maa....Tomay Chara Ghum Ashena(STAR Jalsha)
 Kajol Bhromora
  Haat baralei bondhu 
 Sholo Ana
 Roilo pherar Nimontron
 Ki Ashay Badhi khelaghar
 "Nir Bhanga Jhor"
 Ashambhab
 Nijer Janye Shok (DD Bangla)
 Kone Bou (SUN BANGLA)

Reality shows 
 Dance Bangla Dance Judge (Zee Bangla)
 Abbulish Host (Colors Bangla)
 Srimoti Champion Host (Colors Bangla)
 Dadagiri Unlimited Season 8, Grand Finale Helping hand for South 24 Parganas (Zee Bangla)
 Didi No. 1 Season 5 Contestant (Zee Bangla)
 Didi No. 1 Season 7 Contestant as Aparna of Agnipariksha (Zee Bangla)
 Didi No. 1 Season 8 Contestant with her husband Rajat (Zee Bangla)

See also 
 Anjana Basu
 Locket Chatterjee
 Kanchana Moitra

References

External links 
 

Actresses in Bengali cinema
Bengali television actresses
Living people
Bengali Hindus
Indian film actresses
Indian television actresses
21st-century Indian actresses
1980 births
Indian Hindus